Jack Chase may refer to:

 Jack Chase (Irish boxer) (1904–?), Irish Olympic boxer
 Jack Chase (American boxer) (1914–1972), African-American middleweight

See also
John Chase (disambiguation)